UFC 174: Johnson vs. Bagautinov was a mixed martial arts event that took place on June 14, 2014, at Rogers Arena in Vancouver, British Columbia, Canada.

Background
The event was headlined by a UFC Flyweight Championship bout between the current champion Demetrious Johnson and challenger Ali Bagautinov. Subsequent to this event, on July 10, the British Columbia Athletic Commission (BCAC) announced that Bagautinov tested positive for erythropoietin (EPO) prior to the title fight. In response, the BCAC has suspended him for mixed martial arts competition for one year.

This was the third UFC event held at the Rogers Arena, with the first being UFC 115 on June 12, 2010 (with the venue still being called General Motors Place at the time) and the second UFC 131 on June 11, 2011.

Germaine de Randamie was scheduled to face Milana Dudieva at the event. However, de Randamie was removed from the card due to an alleged visa issue restricting her travel to Canada. Promotional newcomer Valérie Létourneau was then scheduled to face Dudieva.  In turn, Dudieva pulled out of the bout as well and was replaced by Elizabeth Phillips.

Unlike other recent events the preliminary card was shown on FX instead of Fox Sports 1.

Results

Bonus awards
The following fighters were awarded $50,000 bonuses:
 Fight of the Night: Tae Hyun Bang vs. Kajan Johnson
 Performance of the Night: Tae Hyun Bang and Kiichi Kunimoto

See also
List of UFC events
2014 in UFC

References

Ultimate Fighting Championship events
Events in Vancouver
Mixed martial arts in Canada
Sports competitions in Vancouver
2014 in mixed martial arts